Savvas Iliadis (alternate spelling: Savas) (born November 6, 1979) is a former Greek professional basketball player.

Professional career
Iliadis began playing basketball with the junior youth teams of Aias Evosmou. He began his professional career with Aias Evosmou in the Greek 2nd Division during the 2000–01 season. In 2002, he moved to Iraklis.

In 2005, he moved to Panionios. In 2006, he joined Aris, and in 2009, he moved to Kavala. In January 2011, he returned to Iraklis.

National team career
With Greece's under-26 national team, Iliadis won the silver medal at the 2005 Mediterranean Games.

Personal life
Iliadis is an Aris fan. His brother is the Greek football player Stelios Iliadis.

External links
Onsports.gr Profile
FIBA Europe Profile
Euroleague.net Profile
Eurobasket.com Profile
Greek Basket League Profile 
Hellenic Federation Profile 

1979 births
Living people
21st-century Greek people
Aris B.C. players
Basketball players from Thessaloniki
Competitors at the 2005 Mediterranean Games
Greek men's basketball players
Iraklis Thessaloniki B.C. players
Kavala B.C. players
Mediterranean Games medalists in basketball
Mediterranean Games silver medalists for Greece
Panellinios B.C. players
Panionios B.C. players
Point guards
Shooting guards